Arkady Baghdasaryan (Arko) (25 August 1945 - 2022), artist. Honored artist of Armenia, People's Artist of Armenia. One of Armenia’s first abstractionists.

Biography
Born on 25 August 1945 in Baku. In 1971 Arko Baghdasaryan graduated from Yerevan Theatre – Art Institute, the Department of Painting.

Since 1968 Baghdasaryan participated in the Republican and International Exhibitions in Armenia, Russia, United States, Germany, France, Sweden, Italy, Belgium, Japan, Luxembourg, etc. Since 1990 he has been exhibiting his work in solo and group exhibitions throughout Germany. In 2009 Arko participated in group exhibition entitled "Yerevan, my love" in HayArt centerof Yerevan.

Since 1976 he is a member of Artists' Union of Armenia, since 1994 the member of International Association of Professional Artists. 								

Arko Baghdasaryan’s works are in museums and galleries, private or personal collections of Armenia, Russia and other foreign countries.

Exhibitions 
1975 – Yerevan (House of Radio) Armenia
1976 – Yerevan (Union of  Architects) Armenia
1977 – Yerevan (Museum of Modern Art) Armenia
1988 – Marburg (Gerder’s Institute) Germany
1989 – Moscow (Cultural Center of Armenia) Russia
1989 – Fulda (Republican House) Germany
1990 – Moscow (Gallery of Modern Arts ”Mars) Russia
1991 – Erftstadt (City House) Germany
1991 – Cologne (Gallery ”Art – Garden”) Germany
1992 – Heidelberg (Melnikov’s Gallery) Germany
1994 – Ziegenhighn ( Savings Bank ) Germany
1996 – Heidelberg (Melnikov’s Gallery) Germany
1997 – Paris (Mann’s Gallery) France
1997 – Kassel (Museums of brothers Grimm) Germany
2000 – Yerevan (House of the Artists of Armenia) Armenia
2001 – Stepanakert (House of Culture) Nagorny-Karabagh
2005 – Yerevan (House of the Artists of Armenia) Armenia

See also
List of Armenian artists
List of Armenians
Culture of Armenia

References

External links
Arko Baghdasaryan – An Artist Caught in a Conflict
Մանրանկարչության և արդի գեղանկարչության ավանդույթների միահյուսում, Արկո Բաղդասարյան
Serzh Sargsyan congratulates Arkadi Baghdasaryan on his birthdayվ
Arkady Baghdasaryan
Painter Arkadi Baghdasaryan, Arko

1945 births
Armenian painters
Living people
Artists from Baku